Barend Pieterse (born 23 January 1979) is a South African former rugby union footballer and currently the lineout coach of the  and Southern Kings.

Career
Between 2004 and 2010, he also frequently represented the Cats and Cheetahs franchises in the Super Rugby competition. This culminated in a call-up to the South Africa national rugby union team, becoming Springbok No 793. However, he never played a test match for the Springboks, his only appearance was in the 5–22 defeat against the Barbarians in London on 1 December 2007, when he scored the only try of the game for the visitors.

Although he was included in the Kings' 2012 Vodacom Cup and Currie Cup squads, he did not play any games, but took up a role as a lineout coach. He retired at the end of 2012 and became the lineout coach for the Southern Kings.

References

South African rugby union coaches
South African rugby union players
Eastern Province Elephants players
Living people
1979 births
Lions (United Rugby Championship) players
Golden Lions players
Cheetahs (rugby union) players
Free State Cheetahs players
South Africa international rugby union players
Rugby union locks